"A Midsummer Night's Sweetness" is a song by rapper San E and After School's Raina. It was released on June 12, 2014.

Promotions
San E and Raina had their first live stage on Mnet's M! Countdown on June 12, 2014, followed by MBC's Music Core on June 14, 2014.

Chart performance 
After its release on the June 12, "A Midsummer Night's Sweetness" achieved number 1 on all ten major music charts, including Olleh, Bugs, Daum, Naver, Soribada, Genie, Mnet, monkey3, Cyworld, and MelOn.

The song debuted at number 6 on the weekly Gaon Digital Chart, and the following week it rose three spots to number 3. For the week of June 22–28 the song charted at number 1. For the month of July the song charted at number 1 on the monthly Gaon Digital Chart.

Track listing

Charts

Credits and personnel 
Raina - vocals
San E - rap

References

External links
 
 

2014 songs
2014 singles
Gaon Digital Chart number-one singles